Vyazemsky District is an administrative and municipal district (raion), one of the twenty-five in Smolensk Oblast, Russia. It is located in the northeast of the oblast. Its administrative center is the town of Vyazma. Population: 80,436 (2010 Census);  The population of Vyazma accounts for 71.0% of the district's total population.

References

Notes

Sources

Districts of Smolensk Oblast